Johannes Semper ( – 21 February 1970) was an Estonian poet, writer, translator and politician.

He was born in Pahuvere (now Viljandi Parish), Kreis Fellin, in the Governorate of Livonia. A student and later a prominent scholar at the University of Tartu, he was briefly nominated as Minister for Education of Estonia when the country was occupied by the Soviet Union in 1940.

He wrote the lyrics of the Anthem of Estonian SSR.

He died in Tallinn.

References

Extermal links

1892 births
1970 deaths
People from Viljandi Parish
People from Kreis Fellin
Estonian Socialist Revolutionary Party politicians
Estonian Independent Socialist Workers' Party politicians
Communist Party of Estonia politicians
Education ministers of Estonia
People's commissars and ministers of the Estonian Soviet Socialist Republic
Members of the Estonian Constituent Assembly
Members of the Supreme Soviet of the Estonian Soviet Socialist Republic, 1940–1947
Members of the Supreme Soviet of the Estonian Soviet Socialist Republic, 1947–1951
Members of the Supreme Soviet of the Estonian Soviet Socialist Republic, 1963–1967
Members of the Supreme Soviet of the Estonian Soviet Socialist Republic, 1967–1971
Looming (magazine) editors
Estonian male poets
Estonian translators
Estonian magazine editors
20th-century translators
20th-century Estonian poets
University of Tartu alumni
People's Writers of the Estonian SSR
Recipients of the Order of the White Star, 5th Class
Recipients of the Order of Lenin
Recipients of the Order of the Red Banner of Labour
Recipients of the Order of the Red Star
Burials at Metsakalmistu
Estonian essayists